Basic life support (BLS) is a level of medical care which is used for patients with life-threatening illnesses or injuries until they can be given full medical care by advanced life support providers (paramedics, nurses, physicians). It can be provided by trained medical personnel, such as emergency medical technicians, and by qualified bystanders.

Background
The International Liaison Committee on Resuscitation (ILCOR) was formed in 1992 to coordinate the efforts of resuscitation worldwide. The ILCOR representatives come from various countries such as the United States, Canada, Australia, New Zealand, and from the European, Asian, and African continents. In 2000, the committee published the first resuscitation guideline. In 2005, the committee published International Consensus on Cardiopulmonary resuscitation (CPR) and Emergency Cardiovascular Care (ECC) Science with Treatment Recommendations. Since 2010, the committee has provided materials for regional resuscitation providers such as European Resuscitation Council and American Heart Association to write their own guidelines. Since 2015, ILCOR has used a new methodology called Consensus on Science with Treatment Recommendations (COSTR) to evaluate the quality of latest evidence available and to reach a conclusion on the best treatments available in resuscitation. Using the COSTR methodology, ILCOR also started to conduct yearly reviews and published updates on the latest evidence in resuscitation, changing it from the previous 5-yearly review on resuscitation.

CPR provided in the field increases the time available for higher medical responders to arrive and provide ALS care. An important advance in providing BLS is the availability of the automated external defibrillator or AED. This improves survival outcomes in cardiac arrest cases.

Method

D - Danger 
One of the first checks done in emergency response is to assess the situation for any danger. If the person does not remove themselves or others from the danger then they are liable to become a patient and require emergency assistance themselves or become unable to render assistance for the other patient. Examples of dangerous situations which should cease before BLS is administered are electrocution, assault, drowning, burning etc.

R - Response 
Checking for response is the next step in emergency situations as continuing with other forceful methods of BLS could exacerbate the patient's condition and can be seen as assault. AVPU (Alert, Verbal, Pain, Unconscious) is the commonly used acronym for quickly assessing the level of consciousness in a patient. Pain stimulus in particular should be used with caution as many methods if done incorrectly can leave bruises (sternal rub for example) commonly used methods for central stimulus are the trapezius squeeze and for peripheral stimulus it is squeezing the side of the finger.

S - Send for help 
Sending for help allows much more assistance to be rendered upon the patient and increases their chances of receiving ALS.

A - Airway 
Opening of the airway via the Jaw Thrust maneuver is the preferred method as the head-tilt maneuver is thought to be more risky for people with suspected spinal injury. If the person is in danger of pulmonary aspiration then they should be placed in the recovery position or more advanced airway management should be used.

B - Breathing 
Once the airway has been opened checking for breathing should begin, if the respiratory rate is below 12-20 breaths per minute then CPR should begin, however if the patient is breathing normally then the rescuer should place them in the recovery position and summon an ambulance.

C - CPR

D - Defibrillation 
Once an automated external defibrillator (AED) has been acquired the rescuer should then finish the round of CPR, use the AED and then begin another round of CPR. However the AED will usually notify the rescuer of any impediments to continued CPR (such as a sinus rhythm or asystole) in which case the rescuer may be prompted to cease CPR.

Indications

Cardiac arrest 
Cardiac arrest occurs when the heart stops pumping in a regular rhythm. In this situation, early defibrillation is the key to returning the patient's heart back to a normal rhythm. When a defibrillator is not readily available, a rescuer or bystander should keep the blood flowing by performing chest compressions and rescue breaths at an age-appropriate rate until it is.

Respiratory Arrest 
Respiratory arrest is when there is no measurable breathing in a patient. It tends to occur in conjunction with cardiac arrest, but this is not always the case. Respiratory arrest is the most common indication of BLS in infants and toddlers. The most critical factor in restoring breathing in the patient is to provide high quality rescue breaths.

Drowning 
In cases of drowning, rescuers should provide CPR as soon as an unresponsive patient is removed from the water. In particular, rescue breathing is important in this situation. A lone rescuer is typically advised to give CPR for a short time before leaving the patient to call emergency medical services. Since the primary cause of cardiac arrest and death in drowning and choking patients is hypoxemia, it is recommended to start with rescue breaths before proceeding to chest compressions (if pulseless). If the patient presents in a shockable rhythm, early defibrillation is still recommended.

Choking 

Choking occurs when a foreign body obstructs the trachea. Rescuers should only intervene in patients who show signs of severe airway obstruction, such as a silent cough, cyanosis, or inability to speak or breathe. If a patient is coughing forcefully, rescuers should not interfere with this process and encourage the patient to keep coughing. If a patient shows signs of severe airway obstruction, anti-choking maneuvers such as back slaps or in the most severe cases abdominal thrusts should be applied until the obstruction is relieved. If a patient becomes unresponsive he should be lowered to the ground, and the rescuer should call emergency medical services and initiate CPR. When the airway is opened during CPR, the rescuer should look into the mouth for an object causing obstruction, and remove with a finger sweep it if it is evident however many organisations state that the rescuer should not try to remove the foreign object as they might worsen the situation (either pushing it further down the trachea or initiating vomiting).

Technique

United States 
Basic Life Support Emergency Medical Services in the United States are generally identified with Emergency Medical Technicians-Basic (EMT-B). EMT-B is the highest level of healthcare provider that is limited to the BLS protocol; higher medical functions use some or all of the Advanced Cardiac Life Support (ACLS) protocols, in addition to BLS protocols. However, the American Heart Association's BLS protocol is designed for use by laypeople, as well as students and others certified first responder, and to some extent, higher medical function personnel.

BLS for Healthcare Providers Course

According to the American Heart Association, in order to be certified in BLS, a student must take an online or in-person course. However, an online BLS course must be followed with an in-person skills session in order to obtain a certification issued by The American Heart Association.

Chain of survival

The American Heart Association highlights the most important steps of BLS in a "five-link chain of survival." The chain of survival includes early recognition of an ongoing emergency, early initiation of CPR by a bystander, early use of a defibrillator, and early advanced life support once more qualified medical help arrives. Qualified bystanders with training in BLS are encouraged to perform the first three steps of the five-link chain of survival.

High Quality CPR

High quality cardiopulmonary resuscitation (CPR) and early defibrillation using an automated external defibrillator (AED) are the most important aspects of BLS to ensure a patient survives. CPR involves a rescuer or bystander providing chest compressions to a patient in a supine position while also giving rescue breaths. The rescuer or bystander  can also choose not to provide breaths and provide compression-only CPR. Depending on the age and circumstances of the patient, there can be variations in the compression to breath ratio given.

Europe 

European Resuscitation Council

According to 2015 guidelines published by European resuscitation council, early initiation of resuscitation and coordination of lay people with medical personnel on helping an unconscious person is very helpful in increasing the chance of survival of the patient. When a person is unconscious and is not breathing normally, emergency services should be alerted and cardiopulmonary resuscitation (CPR) and mouth-to-mouth resuscitation (rescue breaths) should be initiated. High quality CPR is important. An adequate ratio of high quality chest compressions and rescue breaths are crucial. An automated external defibrillator (AED) machine is essential during resuscitation. Defibrillation during the first 3 to 5 minutes during resuscitation can produce survival rates as high as 50 to 70%. Placing AEDs in public places where there is one cardiac arrest in five years is cost-effective.
Although the adult CPR sequence can be safely used in children, a modified sequence of basic life support that entails less forceful chest compression is even more suitable in children.

United Kingdom

Adult BLS guidelines in the United Kingdom were published in 2015 by the Resuscitation Council (UK), based on the 2015 International Consensus on Cardiopulmonary Resuscitation and Emergency Cardiovascular Care Science with Treatment Recommendations (CoSTR) published in November 2005.
The newest guidelines for adult BLS allow a rescuer to diagnose cardiac arrest if the patient is unresponsive and not breathing normally. The guidelines also changed the duration of rescue breaths and the placement of the hand on the chest when performing chest compressions. These changes were introduced to simplify the algorithm, to allow for faster decision making and to maximize the time spent giving chest compressions; this is because interruptions in chest compressions have been shown to reduce the chance of survival. It is also acknowledged that rescuers may either be unable, or unwilling, to give effective rescue breaths; in this situation, continuing chest compressions alone is advised, although this is only effective for about 5 minutes.
For choking, the guidelines in the United Kingdom first call for assessing the severity of the situation. If the patient is able to speak and cough effectively, the obstruction is mild. If the patient is unable to speak or cough effectively, or is unable to breathe or is breathing with a wheezy sound, the airway obstruction is severe. It is then recommended to perform back blows until the obstruction clears. If the patient becomes unresponsive, CPR is started.

Other countries 
The term BLS is also used in some non-English speaking countries (e.g. in Italy) for the education of first responders. Terms with similar meanings for similar skill sets are also common.
 Spain: SVB (soporte vital básico)
 Belgium: aide médicale urgente ("emergency medical assistance")/ EHBO (eerste hulp bij ongelukken, "first aid")
 Brazil: SBV (Suporte básico de vida)
 France: PSE 1 & PSE 2 (Premiers Secours en Equipe niveaux 1 & 2), "First Aid as part of a team," level 2 includes stretchering and teamwork, (former CFAPSE before 2007 Certificat de Formation aux Activités des Premiers Secours en Equipe, "Training certificate for first aid teamwork")
 Poland: Podstawowe zabiegi resuscytacyjne/ KPP (Kwalifikowana pierwsza pomoc)
 Portugal: SBV (Suporte Básico de Vida)
 Germany: Lebensrettende Sofortmaßnahmen (basic life support)
 Romania: SVB (support vital de bază)
 Netherlands: BLS ("first aid" is referred to as EHBO (Eerste hulp bij ongelukken))
 Turkey: TYD (temel yaşam desteği, "basic life support")

Special Populations 
When performing BLS, laypeople and medical personnel are encouraged to remember that some groups of people have certain conditions that need to be taken into considerations.

Pregnant women 
To relieve choking, chest thrusts should be used instead of abdominal thrusts when the patient is in late pregnancy.

Obese 
If a patient of choking is obese and a rescuer cannot perform adequate abdominal thrusts, they are encouraged to instead perform chest thrusts.

Infants 
To relieve choking, abdominal thrusts should not be used in infants under 1 year of age due to risk of causing injury. A sequence of back slaps and chest compressions are used instead.

References

Emergency medical services
Emergency medicine courses
Emergency life support